Orinoeme ternatensis is a species of beetle in the family Cerambycidae. It was described by Breuning in 1969.

References

T
Beetles described in 1969